Skye Brittany Nicolson (born 27 August 1995) is an Australian professional boxer. As an amateur she competed in the featherweight event at the 2018 Commonwealth Games, winning the gold medal. Nicolson competed at the 2020 Summer Olympics. In her first bout in the women's Feather (54–57 kg) preliminaries she beat Im Ae-ji from Republic of Korea on points. She was beaten in the quarterfinals by Kariss Artingstall from Great Britain.

Early years 
Nicolson was born at Logan Hospital in Meadowbrook, Queensland. She grew up on the Gold Coast and attended Our Lady's College throughout her upbringing. Nicolson started boxing training at 12 years of age in the Gold Coast suburb of Yatala at the Jamie Nicolson Memorial Gym, which is named after her late brother. Her brothers, Jamie and Gavin, were tragically involved in a fatal car crash a year before she was born. Jamie was one of the greatest amateur boxers in Australian history who competed at the 1992 Olympic Games and won a bronze medal at the 1990 Commonwealth Games.

Amateur boxing 
In 2016, Nicolson won bronze at the World Championships in the Welterweight division. She missed out on the Rio 2016 Olympics and moved down 4 weight classes to the featherweight division. She then competed at the 2018 Gold Coast Commonwealth Games and won gold. Nicolson defeated Michaela Walsh from Northern Ireland in the final bout in a split decision and walked away with the victory in her home city of the Gold Coast.

The Queensland athlete claimed her spot on the Tokyo 2020 Australian Olympic Team at the 2020 Asia and Oceana Qualification event held in Amman, Jordan after defeating Mongolia's Bolortuul Tumurkhuyag.

Nicolson reached the quarter final of the 2020 Tokyo Olympics before suffering a 3–2 defeat to Great Britain’s Karriss Artingstall. She retired from amateur competition with a record of 107–32.

Professional career 
Nicolson made her professional debut on 3 March 2022 at the Pechanga Resort & Casino in San Diego, USA against the American fighter Jessica Juarez. Nicolson was victorious, winning the bout with a unanimous decision.

Professional boxing record

References

External links
 

1995 births
Living people
Sportspeople from the Gold Coast, Queensland
Australian women boxers
Featherweight boxers
Light-welterweight boxers
Place of birth missing (living people)
Boxers at the 2018 Commonwealth Games
Commonwealth Games gold medallists for Australia
Commonwealth Games medallists in boxing
Boxers at the 2020 Summer Olympics
Olympic boxers of Australia
Medallists at the 2018 Commonwealth Games